La Puebla is a census-designated place (CDP) in Santa Fe County, New Mexico, United States. It is part of the Santa Fe, New Mexico Metropolitan Statistical Area. The population was 1,296 at the 2000 census.

Geography
La Puebla is located at  (35.992296, -106.000425).

Demographics

As of the census of 2000, there were 1,296 people, 492 households, and 340 families residing in the CDP. The population density was 542.0 people per square mile (209.4/km2). There were 524 housing units at an average density of 219.1 per square mile (84.7/km2). The racial makeup of the CDP was 56.64% White, 0.39% African American, 2.55% Native American, 0.46% Asian, 0.08% Pacific Islander, 34.57% from other races, and 5.32% from two or more races. Hispanic or Latino of any race were 79.94% of the population.

There were 492 households, out of which 40.9% had children under the age of 18 living with them, 49.4% were married couples living together, 14.0% had a female householder with no husband present, and 30.7% were non-families. 22.2% of all households were made up of individuals, and 5.3% had someone living alone who was 65 years of age or older. The average household size was 2.63 and the average family size was 3.15.

In the CDP, the population was spread out, with 29.9% under the age of 18, 8.5% from 18 to 24, 32.3% from 25 to 44, 21.4% from 45 to 64, and 8.0% who were 65 years of age or older. The median age was 34 years. For every 100 females, there were 97.0 males. For every 100 females age 18 and over, there were 98.9 males.

The median income for a household in the CDP was $29,107, and the median income for a family was $34,833. Males had a median income of $30,741 versus $26,964 for females. The per capita income for the CDP was $16,582. About 10.3% of families and 18.1% of the population were below the poverty line, including 27.0% of those under age 18 and 48.9% of those age 65 or over.

Education

It is in Española Public Schools. The comprehensive public high school is Española Valley High School.

See also

 List of census-designated places in New Mexico

References

External link

Census-designated places in Santa Fe County, New Mexico
Census-designated places in New Mexico